Michael Protospatharios was the Byzantine catepan of Italy from 1031 to 1033. He was sent to Bari after his predecessor, Pothos Argyrus, was killed in battle with the Saracens who took Cassano allo Ionio in Calabria. Michael was high and lofty official in the imperial court of Constantinople. He held several high-ranking titles. At the height of his career, his full title was: , that is, "Chamberlain, catepan of Italy, and kritēs of the vēlon and the Hippodrome". The kritēs was probably an officer in charge of processing requests for the audience of the emperor. Michael arrived in Italy early in 1032 with a new army, composed not only of recruits from the West or the auxiliaries, but also from the elite troops of Asia Minor and Syria. It is unknown what became of this grand army, however, as Michael was replaced in 1033 by Constantinos Opos.

References

Sources
Gay, Jules. L'Italie méridionale et l'empire Byzantin: Livre II. Burt Franklin: New York, 1904. 

11th-century catepans of Italy